Paul Crump (April 2, 1930 – October 11, 2002) was a death row inmate who gained international notoriety and parole after writing the novel Burn, Killer, Burn.

Crimes and prison sentences 
Crump served 39 years in prison for killing a security guard in the armed robbery of a Chicago meatpacking plant in 1953. His four accomplices received prison sentences, but Crump was sentenced to die in the electric chair and had 15 execution dates before Louis Nizer took on his case and the sentence was commuted to 199 years by Gov. Otto Kerner. He was paroled in 1993.

He returned to prison after being convicted of harassing a family member and violating an order of protection.

Book 
His novel Burn, Killer, Burn! is autobiographical and was published by the black-owned Johnson Publishing Company in 1962. It is about a murderer who commits suicide rather than be executed.
Life magazine on July 27, 1962, featured a 4-page article on Paul Crump, "Facing Death, A New Life Perhaps Too Late".

Documentaries 
William Friedkin produced and directed a documentary for television titled The People vs. Paul Crump in 1962, when Crump had been on death row for nine years. The program was not aired, due to content regarded as controversial. Nizer's involvement with attorney Donald Moore in the legal battle to have Crump's death sentence commuted was the subject of Robert Drew's 1963 documentary The Chair.

In song 
Folk singer Phil Ochs wrote a song entitled "Paul Crump" that chronicled Crump's life. The song appears on three albums by Ochs: The Early Years, A Toast to Those Who Are Gone, and On My Way.

Death 
Crump died of cancer at age 72, on October 12, 2002, at the Chester Mental Health Center in Chester, Illinois.

References 

1930 births
2002 deaths
American prisoners sentenced to death
20th-century American novelists
American male novelists
Recipients of American gubernatorial clemency
20th-century American male writers